The 11th Annual Premios Juventud (Youth Awards) were broadcast by Univision on July 17, 2014.

Awards and nominees

Music

Novelas

Film

Pop culture

My Favorite DJ

Follow me The Good

Sports

Most Electrifying Guy Jock

The New Pledge

Special awards
Supernova: Enrique Iglesias
Idol of Generations Award: Pitbull
The Best Dressed Award: Ana Brenda Contreras, Austin Mahone

References 

Premios Juventud
Premios
Premios
Premios
Premios
Premios Juventud
Premios Juventud
2010s in Miami